The El Pino Parque Historic District is a U.S. historic district (designated as such on April 26, 1993) located in Daytona Beach, Florida. The district is from 1412 through 1604 North Halifax Drive. It contains 11 historic buildings, many surrounded by palm trees.

References

External links
 Volusia County listings at National Register of Historic Places

National Register of Historic Places in Volusia County, Florida
Historic districts on the National Register of Historic Places in Florida
Daytona Beach, Florida